Garfield is an unincorporated community in Bonneville and Jefferson counties, in the U.S. state of Idaho.

History
Garfield was originally settled chiefly by Mormons. The community was named after James A. Garfield, 20th President of the United States.

References

Unincorporated communities in Bonneville County, Idaho
Unincorporated communities in Jefferson County, Idaho